Admiral John Grouille Williams Jr. (1924–1991) was a four-star admiral who served as Chief of Naval Material (CNM), 1981–1983.

Williams was born on July 24, 1924, in Portland, Oregon, the son of John G. and Julia (Hoare) Williams. He was raised in Ilwaco, Washington, where he graduated from Ilwaco High School.

Williams graduated from the United States Naval Academy in 1946 as a member of the class of 1947.

He retired from the navy in 1983 and died  1924, of lung cancer.

References 

United States Navy admirals
United States Naval Academy alumni
1924 births
1991 deaths
Military personnel from Portland, Oregon
People from Ilwaco, Washington